This is a list of all lighthouses in the U.S. state of Maryland as identified by the United States Coast Guard. There are fourteen active lights in the state as well as three automated caissons and eleven skeleton towers replacing previously manned lights.

The first lighthouse in the state was lit in 1822 and the last in 1965 (ignoring automated towers erected later); the oldest surviving structure is the Pooles Island Light and the oldest still active is the Cove Point Light. The tallest extant tower is the Craighill Channel Lower Range Rear Light.

If not otherwise noted, focal height and coordinates are taken from the United States Coast Guard Light List, while location and dates of activation, automation, and deactivation are taken from the United States Coast Guard Historical information site for lighthouses. Locations of demolished lights have been estimated using National Oceanic and Atmospheric Administration (NOAA) navigational charts.

References

Maryland
 
Lighthouses
Lighthouses